A plurale tantum (Latin for "plural only") is a noun that appears only in the plural form and does not have a singular variant for referring to a single object. In a less strict usage of the term, it can also refer to nouns whose singular form is rarely used.

In English, pluralia tantum are often words that denote objects that occur or function as pairs or sets, such as spectacles, trousers, pants, scissors, clothes, or genitals. Other examples are for collections that, like alms and feces, cannot conceivably be singular. Other examples include suds, jeans, outskirts, odds, riches, surroundings, thanks, and heroics.

In some languages, pluralia tantum refer to points or periods of time (for example, Latin  'calends, the first day of the month', German  'vacation, holiday') or to events (for example, Finnish  'wedding' and  'face'). In some cases there is no obvious semantic reason for a particular noun to be plurale tantum. The Hebrew  'water', Chichewa  'water', Dutch  'brain', Swedish  and Russian  'money' are pluralia tantum.

A bilingual example is the Latin word  that was brought into English; when referring to the symbol of authority, it is a plurale tantum noun in both languages.

English usage

In English, some plurale tantum nouns have a singular form used only attributively. Phrases such as "trouser press" and "scissor kick" contain the singular form, but it is considered nonstandard to say "a trouser" or "a scissor" on its own. That accords with the strong preference for singular nouns in attributive positions in English, but some words are used in the plural form even as attributive nouns, such as "clothes peg", "glasses case" – notwithstanding "spectacle case" and "eyeglass case".

In English, a word may have many definitions only some of which are pluralia tantum. The word "glasses" (a set of corrective lenses to improve eyesight) is plurale tantum. In contrast, the word "glass"— either a container for drinks (a count noun) or a vitreous substance (a mass noun)—  may be singular or plural. Some words, such as "brain" and "intestine", can be used as either plurale tantum nouns or count nouns.

Singulare tantum
The term for a noun that appears only in the singular form is singulare tantum (plural: singularia tantum), such as the English words information, dust, and wealth. Singulare tantum is defined by the Shorter Oxford English Dictionary as "Gram. A word having only a singular form; esp. a non-count noun." Such nouns may refer to a unique singular object (essentially a proper noun), but more often than not, they refer to uncountable nouns, either mass nouns (referring to a substance that cannot be counted as distinct objects, such as milk) or collective nouns (referring to objects that may in principle be counted but are referred to as one, such as popcorn or Arabic   'mulberry'). Given that they do not have a number distinction, they may appear as singulare tantum in one language but as plurale tantum in another. Compare English water to the Hebrew plurale tantum, .

In English, such words are almost always mass nouns. Some uncountable nouns can be alternatively used as count nouns when meaning "a type of", and the plural means "more than one type of". For example, strength is uncountable in Strength is power, but it can be used as a countable noun to mean an instance of [a kind of] strength, as in My strengths are in physics and chemistry. Some words, especially proper nouns such as the name of an individual, are nearly always in the singular form because there is only one example of what that noun means.

Usage in other languages
Pluralia tantum vary arbitrarily between languages. For example, in Swedish, a pair of scissors is just  (literal translation "one scissor"), not a plurale tantum; similarly, in French, a pair of trousers is 'un pantalon'.

In some other languages, rather than quantifying a plurale tantum noun with a measure word, special numeral forms are used in such cases. For larger quantities, "collective numeral" forms are available:  (three doors),  (five violins). Compare them to the ordinary numeral forms found in Polish:  (three films/five films)

The Yiddish word kreplach is a well known example of a plurale tantum that is also plural only in other languages into which it is borrowed, 'one of the kreplach' would be איינער פון די קרעפּלאַך (eyner fun di kreplakh).

References

External links

See also 

Classifier (linguistics)
Defective verb
English plural
Mass noun
Singulative number
Synesis
Wiktionary lists of pluralia tantum

Grammar
Latin words and phrases
Grammatical number

is:Fleirtala